Manuel Opsaras Dishypatos or Disypatos was the metropolitan of Thessalonica between 1258 and 1260/61.

In 1258, he allegedly prophesied the rise to the imperial throne of Michael VIII Palaiologos (r. 1259–1282), but in 1260 or 1261 he was deposed from his see as a supporter of Patriarch Arsenios Autoreianos, who opposed Michael's sidelining of the legitimate emperor, John IV Laskaris (r. 1258–1261). Dishypatos was banished and remained in exile probably until his death; he was still alive in 1275/76. He may be identical to the deacon and kanstresios who donated an icon of the Panagia Hagiosoritissa held since 1440 in the Freising Cathedral. Dishypatos also composed the 14-verse dedicatory poem inscribed on the icon's silver-gilt revetment.

References

Sources
 
 

13th-century deaths
13th-century Byzantine bishops
Byzantine bishops of Thessalonica
People of the Empire of Nicaea